Spearing may refer to:

People
A. C. Spearing (born 1936), Professor of English at the University of Virginia
Glenn Spearing (born 1985), Irish darts player
James Z. Spearing (1864–1942), American politician
Jay Spearing (born 1988), English footballer
Nigel Spearing (born 1930), English politician
Tony Spearing (born 1964), English footballer

Other
A penalty in ice hockey
Spearing (gridiron football) a penalty in American and Canadian football
Spear tackle a type of foul tackle in rugby and Australian Rules football
Spearfishing

See also
Spear (disambiguation)